Frederick James O'Neill (1865–1892), nicknamed "Tip", was a professional baseball player who played outfielder in the American Association for the 1887 New York Metropolitans.

External links

1865 births
1892 deaths
19th-century baseball players
Canadian expatriate baseball players in the United States
Major League Baseball outfielders
New York Metropolitans players
Hamilton Primrose players
Denver Mountain Lions players
London Tecumsehs (baseball) players
Detroit Wolverines (minor league) players
Major League Baseball players from Canada
Canadian baseball players
Canadian sportspeople of Irish descent
Port Huron (minor league baseball) players